is a Japanese football player. He plays for Preah Khan Reach Svay Rieng in the Cambodian League.

References

Honours

Club
Boeung Ket
 Cambodian League: 2017, 2020

External links

1991 births
Living people
Meiji University alumni
Association football people from Chiba Prefecture
Japanese footballers
J3 League players
FC Ryukyu players
Albirex Niigata Singapore FC players
Japanese expatriate sportspeople in Cambodia
Expatriate footballers in Singapore
Expatriate footballers in Cambodia
Association football midfielders